Bulunsky District (Buluŋ uluuha) is an administrative and municipal district (raion, or ulus), one of the thirty-four in the Sakha Republic, Russia. It is located in the north of the republic and borders Ust-Yansky District in the east, Verkhoyansky District in the southeast, Eveno-Bytantaysky and Zhigansky Districts in the south, Olenyoksky District in the west, and Anabarsky District in the northwest. Its administrative center is the urban-type settlement of Tiksi. As of the 2010 Census, the total population of the district was 9,054, with the population of Tiksi accounting for 55.9% of that number.

Geography
The district is washed by the Laptev Sea in the north. The main river in the district is the Lena, with its tributaries Eyekit, Molodo and Syungyude. Other rivers include the Olenyok, with the Khorbusuonka and the Kyuyutingde, as well as the Omoloy and the Khara-Ulakh. There are many lakes in the Lena River delta. The Lena Delta Wildlife Reserve is located in the district.

Climate

History
The district was established on December 10, 1930. Initially, its administrative center was in the selo of Kyusyur. In 1957, the administrative center was moved to Tiksi.

Administrative and municipal status
Within the framework of administrative divisions, Bulunsky District is one of the thirty-four in the republic. It is divided into one settlement (an administrative division with the administrative center in the urban-type settlement (inhabited locality) of Tiksi) and eight rural okrugs (naslegs), all of which comprise nine rural localities. As a municipal division, the district is incorporated as Bulunsky Municipal District. The Settlement of Tiksi is incorporated into an urban settlement, and the eight rural okrugs are incorporated into six rural settlements within the municipal district. The urban-type settlement of Tiksi serves as the administrative center of both the administrative and municipal district.

Inhabited localities

Economy

The economy of the district is mostly based on reindeer husbandry and fishing. Tiksi is a sea port on the Northern Sea Route.

Demographics
As of the 2010 Census, the ethnic composition was as follows:
Russians: 29.1%
Evenks: 25.2%
Yakuts: 23.6%
Evens: 14.2%
Ukrainians: 3.7%
others: 4.0%

References

Notes

Sources
Official website of the Sakha Republic. Registry of the Administrative-Territorial Divisions of the Sakha Republic. Bulunsky District.

External links

Districts of the Sakha Republic